The Black Sessions is the second greatest hits compilation album by Swedish metal band Katatonia, released on February 21, 2005, through Peaceville. The compilation includes hit songs, B-sides and rarities recorded on the band's previous studio albums (from Tonight's Decision to Viva Emptiness). A live DVD for the band performing in Krakow, Poland, in April 2003 is also included in the compilation.

The song "Wait Outside" is recorded during the Viva Emptiness recording session but previously unreleased anywhere. A remixed and remastered version of the song is included on the 10th anniversary edition of Viva Emptiness.

Track listing

Disc one - CD

Disc two - CD

Disc three - DVD

Personnel

Katatonia
Jonas Renkse – lead vocals, production on Disc 1 & 2, songwriting on all other tracks other than "Nightmares by the Sea",  drums on Discouraged Ones, Disc 1 & 2, additional guitar, mixing & programming on Viva Emptiness on Disc 1 & 2
Anders Nyström – lead guitar, production Disc 1 & 2, songwriting on Discouraged Ones & Tonight's Decision, music on  Teargas EP / Last Deal Gone Down / Tonight's Music & Viva Emptiness, keyboards on Discouraged Ones, Tonight's Decision & Viva Emptiness, mellotron on  Teargas EP / Last Deal Gone Down / Tonight's Music backing vocals, mixing &  programming on Viva Emptiness Disc 1 & 2
Fred Norrman – rhythm guitar on Disc 1-3, bass guitar on Tonight's Decision Disc 1 & 2), music on Teargas EP / Last Deal Gone Down / Tonight's Music, "A Premonition"
Mattias Norrman – bass guitar on Last Fair Deal Gone Down & Viva Emptiness Disc 1 & 2, Disc 3
Daniel Liljekvist – drums on Last Fair Deal Gone Down & Viva Emptiness Disc 1 & 2, Disc 3, backing vocals on track 7, Disc 1

Additional personnel
Micke Oretoft – bass guitar and production on Discouraged Ones Disc 1 & 2
David Castillo - remastering on Discouraged Ones Disc 1 & 2
Fred Estby - engineering on Discouraged Ones Disc 1 & 2
Tomas Skogsberg - engineering & mixing Discouraged Ones, Teargas EP & Last Fair Deal Gone Down Disc 1 & 2, engineering on Tonight's Music Disc 1 & 2
Mikael Åkerfeldt - vocals production on Discouraged Ones & Tonight's Decision Disc 1 & 2
Dan Swanö – drums on Tonight's Decision Disc 1 & 2 & editing on Viva Emptiness Disc 1 & 2
Joakim Petterson - engineering on Tonight's Decision Disc 1 & 2
Jonas Kjellgren - engineering on Tonight's Music Disc 1 & 2
Mia Lorentzon - mastering on Tonight's Music Disc 1 & 2
Peter in de Betou - mastering on Teargas EP, Viva Emptiness & Last Fair Deal Gone Down Disc 1 & 2, editing on Last Fair Deal Gone Down Disc 1 & 2
Jocke Pettersson - mixing & engineering on Teargas EP / Last Fair Deal Gone Down / Tonight's Music Disc 1 & 2
Ian Agate  - assisting engineering on Viva Emptiness Disc 1 & 2
Jens Bogren - mixing on Viva Emptiness'' Disc 1 & 2
Jeff Buckley - songwriter on "Nightmares by the Sea"

See also
List of "Greatest Hits" albums

References

2005 compilation albums
2005 live albums
2005 video albums
Katatonia albums
Live video albums
Albums with cover art by Travis Smith (artist)